The Rules of the Game is a 1939 French film, directed by Jean Renoir.

(The) Rules of the Game may also refer to:

"The Rules of the Game" (Crusade), an episode of the television series Crusade
"Rules of the Game" (Sliders), an episode of the television series Sliders
Rules of the Game (song), a 1983 single by Bucks Fizz
Rules of the Game (book), a 2007 book by Neil Strauss
Rules of the Game (EP), an EP by Catch 22
Rules of the Game (film), a 2014 British film
The Rules of the Game (play), a 1918 play by Luigi Pirandello
The rules of a mind game called The Game
"The Rules of the Game", an episode of the television show The Game
Les Régles du jeu (magazine), a French literary journal.
Rules of the Game, a BBC series aired in 2022.

See also
The Rule of the Game, a 2002 Taiwanese film
 Laws of the Game (disambiguation)